Asiagomphus yayeyamensis is a species of dragonfly in the family Gomphidae. It is endemic to Japan.

References

Insects of Japan
Gomphidae
Insects described in 1926
Taxonomy articles created by Polbot